Pyatina is a rural locality (a village) in Leninskoye Rural Settlement, Kudymkarsky District, Perm Krai, Russia. The population was 69 as of 2010.

Geography 
Pyatina is located 41 km south of Kudymkar (the district's administrative centre) by road. Tikhonyata is the nearest rural locality.

References 

Rural localities in Kudymkarsky District